Mudassar Bukhari (born 26 December 1983) is a Dutch international cricketer who made his debut for the Netherlands national cricket team in July 2007. He represented the Dutch team at both One Day International (ODI) and Twenty20 International level. He played as a bowling all-rounder often as a pinch hitter and a finisher.

Career
Mudassar made his debut for the Netherlands in a first class fixture against Canada. He batted at eight and made an unbeaten 66 which he followed up with two quick top order Canadian wickets. He also made ODIs against Canada national cricket team on 3 July 2007. On his debut matches Bukhari took 3 wicket of 8 over and 6 runs with the bats. In 2014 ICC World Twenty20, he took 3 for 12 to defeat England. He was later awarded the Man of the Match.

Bukhari's best bowling performance in Twenty20 Internationals came on 3 February 2016 against UAE. He took 4 wickets from 7 runs and Netherlands won the match by a margin of 84 runs. Bukhari was adjudged man of the match as well.

In September 2016, Bukhari announced his retirement from four-day cricket and 50-over cricket.

References

External links

1983 births
Living people
Dutch cricketers
Netherlands One Day International cricketers
Netherlands Twenty20 International cricketers
Cricketers at the 2011 Cricket World Cup
Pakistani emigrants to the Netherlands
Cricketers from Gujrat
Dutch people of Punjabi descent